Adam Leonard is an English singer-songwriter working mainly in the folk, psychedelic and electronic music fields. His style is often described as lo-fi and the subject matter of his songs somewhat unconventional. Since his debut album How Music Sounds in 2003, he has released many EPs, albums and mini-albums on various small labels. Live performances, which have so far been limited to the UK (Manchester, London and Northern Ireland) are as intriguing as they are rare. In 2008 he opened for British folk musician Steve Ashley. He regularly collaborates with other musicians, most notably Pat Gubler (P.G. Six), Ashley Cooke (Pulco), Gareth Davies, and Steven Collins of The Owl Service, a band for which Leonard provided vocals for their 2010 album The View From A Hill. At the close of 2010, a limited edition album entitled Nature Recordings was released on vinyl only by the London label The Great Pop Supplement. In 2011, Leonard provided the soundtrack to Claudia Heindel's award-winning independent film, Lucky Seven. In 2012, Nature Recordings was issued on CD by Manchester-based label The Northwestern Series.

In 2013 Leonard formed Invaderband, a four-piece "Artrock/Garagerock/Krautrock" group and began gigging locally around Northern Ireland, including a slot at Other Voices in 2014. Occasional solo gigs still took place, including opening for Nick Harper.

Leonard was the winner of UK City of Culture 2013 Resonate Award for Best Song ("My Love").

In 2014, he embarked on the Octopus Project releasing eight albums over an eight-month period. In 2015, Invaderband released two singles ("The Implausible Man" and "Attack of the Pod People"), the latter making the BBC 6 Music playlist in December 2015. Invaderband's debut album was released in January 2017. In September 2017, the Invaderband album was shortlisted for the Northern Ireland Music Prize

In 2018, Leonard released a solo 7" single "Entkommen", on the Polytechnic Youth label, and also collaborated with Irish/French/New York band, Warriors Of The Dystotheque, on the I Know You'll Never Die EP released by Dublin's Reckless Records. The two main tracks were remixed by Le Galaxie and Richard March of Bentley Rhythm Ace.

In January 2021 a new Invaderband album was announced via invaderband.com. The first single from the album 'I Won't Remember You' was released on March 12

Invaderband's 2nd album "Peter Gabriel" was released September 2021. The sleeve was a painting of Peter Gabriel by Luke Haines. The band played the Other Voices festival in November and the album received national radio play in the UK and Ireland, favourable reviews, and ended up in a number of ‘Best albums of 2021’ lists

Leonard's solo electronic album "Rendlesham" was released on cassette by The Dark Outside late 2021, and on vinyl by Polytechnic Youth July 2022. The album was reviewed by The Quietus and Fortean Times

Selected discography
How Music Sounds album, 2003 (Real Wood, RW010)
How Real Is Real? mini-album, 2004 (Apport)
Sgt. Pepper remake, 2005 (joint release by Real Wood/Bottled Music, BOTLP22).
Leonardism album, 2007 (RW021) (Real Wood, RW021)
It Happened on a Day 10" EP, 2007 (Great Pop Supplement, GPS23)
Dan & Headless Bill – REDLIP mini-album, 2008 (Real Wood) – reissued by Folkwit Records, 2011
To Give Up You Have To Bloody Start Live EP, 2008 (Real Wood, RW023)
Nature Recordings vinyl LP, 2010 (Great Pop Supplement, GPS64)
The View From A Hill, with The Owl Service, 2010 (Rif Mountain, RM-004)
Nature Recordings CD album, 2012 (The Northwestern Series, Pendle 01)
The Man Of Lists with Pulco, 2012 (Folkwit Records, f0079)
Click Click Drone EP (by Echoes In Rows), 2013 (Tectona Grandis, TEAK01)
Songs For Abandoned Tube Stations by Relycs, 3-track cassette EP, 2013 (No label)
Sightings EP, as A Farewell To Hexes, 2013 (Tectona Grandis, TEAK02)
Yesterday, Perhaps (Songs Of The Kitchen Cynics) V/A compilation, 2013 (Les Enfants Du Paradiddle, ENF100) 
Octopus Part 1 download album, 2014 (self-release via bandcamp)
Octopus Part 2 download album, 2014 (self-release via bandcamp)
Octopus Part 3 download album, 2014 (self-release via bandcamp)
Octopus Part 4 download album, 2014 (self-release via bandcamp)
Octopus Part 5 download album, 2014 (self-release via bandcamp)
Octopus Part 6 download album, 2015 (self-release via bandcamp)
Octopus Part 7 download album, 2015 (self-release via bandcamp)
Octopus Part 8 download album, 2015 (self-release via bandcamp)
 Invaderband "The Implausible Man" 2 track CD single, 2015 (self-release)
 Invaderband "Attack of the Pod People" 3 track CD single, 2015 (self-release)
 Last Night I Dreamt Of Hibrihteselle with Richard Moult, 2015 (Wild Silence, WS008/WS09) 
 Invaderband "Invaderband" – self-titled debut album (LP/CD) (Tectona Grandis, TEAK005LP / TEAK005CD), 2017
 Entkommen Parts 1 & 2 - 7" single (Polytechnic Youth, PY64), 2018
Octopus Part 9 download album, 2018 (self-release via bandcamp)
I Know You'll Never Die EP with Warriors Of The Dystotheque (Reckless Records, RR38), 2018
Things In The Shadows EP with Warriors Of The Dystotheque (Glasstone Records), 2019
Rooms album from United Bible Studies, 2019 (currently unreleased)
It's Another Christmas - single, (self-release via bandcamp) 2019
The Isolation Tapes V/A compilation (Castles In Space, CIS062MC), 2020
Invaderband "I Won't Remember You" single (Tectona Grandis, TEAK09), 2021
Invaderband "Handcuffed Man Shoots Himself" single (Tectona Grandis, TEAK10), 2021
A Farewell To Hexes "Rendlesham" (TDO Cassettes, TDO042), 2021
Invaderband "Peter Gabriel" album (Tectona Grandis, TEAK11), 2021
Invaderband "Cheese Slices" single (Tectona Grandis, TEAK14), 2022
A Farewell To Hexes "Rendlesham" (Polytchnic Youth, PY160), 2022
Echoes In Rows 'Click Click Drone''' mini-album (Tectona Grandis, TEAK16), 2022 Octopus Part 10 download album (self-release via bandcamp), 2022
Adam Leonard 'Dark Dog''' 7" single (Western Hemlock, WH002), 2022

References

External links
The Message Tapes - The Music of Adam Leonard
Invaderband.com
AllMusic

Living people
English folk guitarists
English rock guitarists
English male guitarists
English male singer-songwriters
1969 births